Haegen is a commune in the Bas-Rhin department in Grand Est in north-eastern France.

Population

Geography
Haegen is a mountain village located on the western frontier of Alsace which at this point coincides with the western frontier of the Alemanish dialect area.   Across the Vosges Mountains to the west of the commune is Lorraine.

On the Alsace side, neighbouring communes are Saverne and Gottenhouse to the north-east, and Thal-Marmoutier and Reinhardsmunster to the south-east.

Landmarks
The commune contains the ruined remains of a twelfth-century castle, one of the earliest surviving castles in the North Vosges region, and of a fourteenth-century smaller fortress.   These are known as the Château du Grand-Geroldseck and the Château du Petit-Geroldseck.

See also
 Communes of the Bas-Rhin department

References

Communes of Bas-Rhin
Bas-Rhin communes articles needing translation from French Wikipedia